Chipping Barnet or High Barnet is a suburban market town in north London, forming part of the London Borough of Barnet, England. Its population, including its localities East Barnet, New Barnet, Hadley Wood, Monken Hadley, Cockfosters and Arkley, was 47,359 in 2011.

Its name is very often abbreviated to just Barnet, which is also the name of the borough of which it forms a part; the town has been part of Greater London since 1965 after the abolition of Barnet Urban District then in Hertfordshire. Chipping Barnet is also the name of the Parliamentary constituency covering the local area – the word "Chipping" denotes the presence of a market, one that was established here at the end of the 12th century and persists to this day.

History 

The town's name, recorded as Barneto in about 1070, Barnet in 1197, and La Barnette in 1248, is derived from Old English bærnet: "the land cleared by burning". It refers to the clearing of land in an area that was once densely forested.

In Saxon times the site was part of an extensive wood called Southaw, belonging to the Abbey of St Albans. Barnet's elevated position is indicated in one of its alternative names ("High Barnet"), which appears in many old books and maps, and which the Great Northern Railway company adopted for the railway station opened in 1872 (now High Barnet tube station). The area was historically a common resting point on the traditional Great North Road between the City of London and York and Edinburgh.

This was the site of the Battle of Barnet in 1471 (more accurately, Hadley), where Yorkist troops led by King Edward IV killed the rebellious "Kingmaker" Richard Neville, Earl of Warwick, and Warwick's brother, John Neville, 1st Marquess of Montagu. This was one of the most important battles of the Wars of the Roses. Barnet Hill is said to be the hill mentioned in the nursery rhyme "The Grand Old Duke of York".

It is also the site of an ancient and well-known horse fair, whence comes the rhyming slang of Barnet Fair or barnet for "hair". The fair dates back to 1588 when Queen Elizabeth I granted a charter to the Lord of the Manor of Barnet to hold a twice yearly fair.

The famous Barnet Market is now (2018) nearly 820 years old. On 23 August 1199 King John issued a charter for a market at Barnet to the Lord of the Manor, the Abbot of St. Albans, John de Cella.

Chipping Barnet was historically a civil parish of Hertfordshire and formed part of the Barnet Urban District from 1894. The parish was abolished in 1965 and the Chipping Barnet section of its former area was transferred from Hertfordshire to Greater London and the newly created London Borough of Barnet. In 1951 the population was 7,062.

Barnet belonged to the County of Hertfordshire until 1965, when under the London Government Act 1963, East Barnet Urban District and Barnet Urban District were abolished and their area was transferred to Greater London to form part of the present-day London Borough of Barnet.

At the beginning of the 21st century, a tongue-in-cheek movement calling for the name Barnet to be changed to "Barnét" began to gain the attention of the public and the national media, with many public road signs in the area regularly being altered to contain the accented character.

Religious sites 
St John the Baptist Church is a landmark for miles around and stands in what was the centre of the town. It was erected by John de la Moote, abbot of St Albans, about 1400, the architect being Beauchamp. Playing on its antiquity, it continues to call itself "Barnet Church", although this is not an official title. It is in fact the parish church of Chipping Barnet only, whilst Christ Church is the parish church of High Barnet, St Mark's is the parish church of Barnet Vale, St James's is the parish church of New Barnet, and Holy Trinity is the parish church of the Lyonsdown district. In addition, St Mary the Virgin is the parish church of East Barnet and St John of Friern Barnet. The parish church of St Mary the Virgin, Monken Hadley (rebuilt 1494) also has parish boundaries that include a significant part of High Barnet, including much of Barnet High Street.

The living of Barnet is a curacy, held with the rectory of East Barnet till the death of the last incumbent in 1866, when the livings were separated. The parish of Chipping Barnet, served by St John's Church, was provided with a chapel-of-ease in Victorian times; subsequently Chipping Barnet parish was split in two, and the chapel-of-ease (on Bells Hill, Barnet) raised to the status of a parish church, dedicated to St Stephen.

Geography 
Chipping Barnet is designated as a Neighbourhood Centre in the London Plan.

The tower of Barnet parish church – St John the Baptist – at the top of Barnet Hill claims to be the highest point between itself and the Ural Mountains  to the east. However, the same has been said of numerous other points. Since the opening of the railway, development has increased considerably, especially in the west of the area near Arkley.

Demography 
Chipping Barnet town centre is covered by the High Barnet ward. According to the 2011 census, the population was 82% white (68% White British, 11% Other White, 3% White Irish). Indians made up 4% of the population, and all black groups made up 3%. The whole town is defined as the Chipping Barnet parliamentary constituency, which takes up the eastern third of the wider borough. This data does not represent the town as a whole due to the fact that it contains six other wards.

Education 
Bodens Performing Arts College

Transport 

Barnet Hill is a major hill on the historic Great North Road. In coaching days, 150 stagecoaches passed through Barnet daily. The modern Great North Road replacement, the A1, runs to the west of the town along Barnet Bypass.

Tube and train 
Totteridge and Whetstone Underground station serves the affluent areas bearing the same name southwest of High Barnet town centre. Oakleigh Park railway station serves the eastern extremity of the town. The Barnet Tunnel is also in the area.

Public services 

Barnet is served by Barnet Hospital, which is run by The Royal Free London NHS Foundation Trust as part of the English National Health Service. There is also an NHS clinic in Vale Drive (near Barnet Hill and High Barnet station). London Ambulance Service responds to medical emergencies in Barnet. Home Office policing is provided by the Metropolitan Police Service. Statutory emergency fire service is provided by the London Fire Brigade, which has a station on Station Road, built in 1992.

Sport and recreation 
Barnet FC is the local football team, currently in the Vanarama National League, the fifth tier of English football – at the end of the 2017/18 season Barnet were relegated from League Two, and have remained in the Vanarama National League since. They played at the Underhill Stadium until 2012/13 but from the 2013/14 season are playing at The Hive Stadium in Stanmore in the London Borough of Harrow. They first reached the Football League in 1991 as champions of the GM Vauxhall Conference but lost their status 10 years later with relegation, only to return four years later – again as Conference champions. London Lions F.C. is also based in Barnet, near Stirling Corner, but the 1st team plays midweek and some cup home games at Hemel Hempstead Town F.C. as its own ground is not floodlit and does not meet the requirements for some cup competitions. There are a number of amateur football clubs based in Barnet including East Barnet Old Grammarians and Ravenscroft Old Boys.

Barnet Cricket Club and Old Elizabethans' Cricket Club have merged to form one club in Barnet and currently play their games at Gypsy Corner. Shaftesbury Barnet Harriers is a local athletics club. Chipping Barnet has a King George's Field in memorial to King George V. Old Court House Recreation Ground is a park in High Barnet.

Similarly to the cricket clubs, Barnet and Old Elizabethans rugby clubs merged to form Barnet Elizabethans RFC, playing in Byng Road, Barnet, near Queen Elizabeth's School.

High Barnet is home to an Everyman cinema, the Barnet Museum, the All Saints Art Centre, the Ravenscroft local park and Barnet recreational park, a now disused well that was frequented by, among others, Samuel Pepys, and many restaurants and public houses.

Cuisines on offer include Italian, French, Indian, Chinese and south east Asian. Amongst the most popular restaurants are branches of Melange and Pizza Express. High Barnet also has a number of coffee/snack outlets, both independent ones such as The Coffee Bean and Huddle, as well as branches of Caffè Nero, Costa Coffee, and Nkora. A branch of Carluccio's occupied a site in The Spires but was replaced in 2021 by the brasserie Botannika.

Local festivals include the traditional annual Barnet Fair, which was chartered in Medieval times, the High Barnet Chamber Music Festival, and Barnet Medieval Festival.

A small nightclub operated for a few years in the 1980s in the premises now occupied by the Butchers Arms pub. The public houses and bars in High Barnet include: the Butchers Arms, The Red Lion, the King's Head, the Monk, the Black Horse, Ye Olde Mitre Inn, the Hadley Oak, the Nelson, and the Sebright Arms. The large number of inns in Barnet was a matter of note in Charles Dickens's novel Oliver Twist; it was here that Oliver met the Artful Dodger.

Local papers
The principal local newspapers are The Barnet and Potters Bar Times and The Barnet Post, which was established in July 2021.

The Barnet Press operated until 2017.

The Barnet Society also frequently publishes articles on local news as well as a quarterly newsletter.

Notable people
 Louis Blundell (born 1978), darts player, grew up in the town.
 Geoffrey Chater (1921–2021), character actor, was born in the town.
 Lenny Cooper (born 1981), English cricketer
 Nadine Coyle (born 1985), singer, grew up in the town.
 Paul Freeman  (born 1943), actor, was born in the town.
 Ravi Haria (born 1999), chess grandmaster
 Stuart Holden (born 1955), darts player, was born in the town.
 Mark Kermode (born 1963), film critic and musician, was born in the town.
 Nicko McBrain (born 1952), drummer, grew up in the town. 
 Elaine Paige (born 1948), theatre actress and singer, radio host, was born in the town.
 Mike Skinner (born 1979), rapper, singer-songwriter, musician, and record producer, was born in the town.

Neighbouring areas

See also 
List of people from Barnet
List of schools in Barnet
Church View and Church Cottages
Church House, Barnet

References

External links 

 Barnet Residents Association
 The Barnet Society
 Barnet (A Guide to Old Hertfordshire)
 Love Barnet
 High Barnet Chamber Music Festival
 Barnet Medieval Festival

 
Market towns in London
District centres of London